Epropetes elongata is a species of beetle in the family Cerambycidae. It was described by Martins in 1975.

References

Tillomorphini
Beetles described in 1975